Garrwa or Garawa may be,

Garrwa people
Garrwa language